Johannes "Jan" de Rooij (26 January 1932 – 18 May 2008) was a Dutch amateur boxer. He competed at the 1960 and 1964 Olympics and was eliminated in the third and first match, respectively. During his career he won 10 national titles and after retiring worked as a boxing coach in Amsterdam.

References

1932 births
2008 deaths
Featherweight boxers
Bantamweight boxers
Boxers from Amsterdam
Olympic boxers of the Netherlands
Boxers at the 1960 Summer Olympics
Boxers at the 1964 Summer Olympics
Dutch male boxers